Karl Hotz (29 April 1877, Wertheim am Main  – 20 October 1941) was a German engineer and Wehrmacht officer. He was killed as chief of Feldkommandantur 518 in Nantes during German occupation of France in World War II.

Occupation of Nantes
The German occupation forces, under General Otto von Stülpnagel, were not internally attacked from the Armistice of 22 June 1940 to the 22 June 1941 German invasion of the Soviet Union.

The Soviet Union was de facto allied with Germany under the German–Soviet Non-Aggression Pact. As a result, Moscow's Comintern headquarters instructed the French Communist Party (Parti Communiste Français, PCF) to take no action against the German occupying power. With a telegram from the Comintern to the PCF on 26 April 1941, a National Front was now to be formed. Subsequent events showed that the Comintern could not dictate to French communists.

On 13 August 1941, a group of 100 young people formed by the PCF youth wing walked out of the Strasbourg – Saint-Denis station singing la Marseillaise under the tricolor flag, held by student Olivier Souef. French police intervened and German soldiers opened fire. Samuel Tyszelman was hit in the leg. Henri Gautherot (b. 1920) fled but was caught in the nearby Boulevard Saint-Martin. Tyszelman and Gautherot were executed on 19 August

Two days later, on August 21, 1941, the first assassination of a representative of the German occupying power followed as revenge. In retaliation, six French prisoners were convicted, sentenced to death and executed by a newly constituted French special court under pressure from the German occupying forces.

On September 3, 1941, the corporal of the Commander Transportation Department (Paris) Ernst Hoffmann was shot dead by unknown persons. Hoffmann was accompanied by his bride, who had received a visitor's permit. The strike took place around 10 pm in front of Hoffmann's accommodation, the Hôtel Terminus, on rue Strasbourg. Two days later, the Commander of Greater Paris, Ernst Schaumburg, handed over to the military commander, with reference to the hostage jail, a list of 10 hostages, the first three of whom were executed on September 6 on Mont Valérien. On September 6, 10 and 11, there were more attacks, which resulted in wounds. In retaliation, the military commander ordered the shooting of 10 communist hostages. The executions took place on 16 September on Mont Valérien.

On September 15, the assassination of Captain Wilhelm Scheben (Transport Command Paris-Nord) occurred. Scheben had also lived in the Hôtel Terminus and had been shot from a car on boulevard de Strasbourg. He died on 17 September. The military commander ordered the shooting of 12 communist hostages on the same day, which took place on Mont Valérien on 20 September.

Assassination
Brustlein fired two shots and hit Hotz in the back. Guisco's revolver jammed, saving the life of Hotz's fellow officer, Captain Wilhelm Sieger. Hotz died a few moments later while the Resistance fled.

Reprisals
The assassination led to the arrest and execution of 48 hostages on 22 October 1941, including Guy Môquet, Charles Michels and Jean-Pierre Timbaud.

Another 95 hostages were later arrested. In three subsequent trials, 47 people were sentenced to death and 14 relatives (if known) were shot or deported as hostages and killed in concentration camps.

References

Engineers from Baden-Württemberg
1877 births
1941 deaths
German Army personnel killed in World War II
People murdered in France
People from Wertheim am Main
Military personnel from Baden-Württemberg
Deaths by firearm in France
German Army officers of World War II